GDH 559 Co., Ltd., usually known as GDH, is a film studio subsidiary of the Thai entertainment conglomerate GMM Grammy. It was founded on 5 January 2016, as a successor to GMM Tai Hub (GTH) — Thailand's most successful film studio of the prior 11 years — which had been dissolved in December 2015 due to internal conflicts between the company's three major shareholders — GMM Grammy,  and Hub Ho Hin. GDH had released films of various genres such as romance, comedy, horror and drama as well as the hit film Bad Genius.

Background
GDH was formed as a joint venture between GMM Grammy and Hub Ho Hin Bangkok following the closure of GMM Tai Hub. The company was registered on December 14, 2015, with registered capital of 150,000,000 million baht under the same shareholding proportion. With the departure of GTH's former president Visute Poolvoralaks, GMM Grammy and Hub Ho Hin rejoined to create GDH 559, which inherited almost all of GTH's creative personnel and resources.

According to Jira Maligool, the company name is said to stand for Gross Domestic Happiness, which refers to the happiness of spectators and workers, and the numbers in the company name refer to the date and year of the company's foundation as well as its number of new shareholders of 59 people. During its tenure as GTH, GMM Grammy holds 51% of its share and Hub Ho Hin Bangkok holds 15%, and of Tai Entertainment by 30%.  Despite the management changes, GDH retains its same Bangkok headquarters as Hub Ho Hin Film and GTH and has since expanded to more companies around its neighbourhood.

The company used the placeholder trade name GDH Five Five Nine until an official logo was issued. It then changed its current trade name to simply GDH.

Corporate structure
GDH 559 is owned by GMM Grammy, which holds a majority 51% stake, and Hub Ho Hin, which owns 15%. The rest is held by individual shareholders, most of whom are the company's staff and crew. GDH operates the various aspects of its business through its subsidiaries and affiliates:

Jor Kwang Films Co., Ltd. is GDH's production company, although it is not a direct subsidiary; the company is owned by GDH's directors and producers.

Nadao Bangkok Co., Ltd.
Nadao Bangkok covers artist management, production, and television series development.
Sawasdee Thaweesuk Co., Ltd.
Promotion
Ngandee Thaweesuk Co., Ltd.
Public relations and event management
The Secret Farm Co., Ltd.
Online digital agency
Siangdee Thaweesuk Co., Ltd.
Sound recording
Good Things Happen Co., Ltd.
Sales
Wondermega Entertainment Co., Ltd.
television series development, production, and animation studio.

Filmography

Alongside its current slate of films, GDH 559 also owns the distribution rights to all of the film libraries produced and distributed by its predecessor companies GTH, GMM Pictures, Tai Entertainment and Hub Ho Hin Bangkok.

As of 2021, the majority of the GDH/GTH film catalogue is now available on streaming in Thailand through Disney+ Hotstar.

Films

Television series

References

External links
 

GDH 559
GMM Grammy
Privately held companies
Film production companies of Thailand
Mass media companies established in 2016
2016 establishments in Thailand